Auraria West station is an RTD light rail station in Denver, Colorado, United States. Operating as part of the E and W Lines, the station opened on April 5, 2002, and is operated by the Regional Transportation District. It primarily serves the adjacent Auraria academic campus, home to Metropolitan State University of Denver, the Community College of Denver, and the University of Colorado Denver.

FasTracks and station relocation 
The original Auraria West Campus station closed on July 23, 2011. The new relocated Auraria West station opened on October 31, 2011, near Fifth and Walnut on a north–south alignment near the Consolidated Main Line (CML) tracks. The relocated station is the diverging point for the FasTracks W Line to Lakewood and Golden.

References 

RTD light rail stations in Denver
Railway stations in the United States opened in 2002
Auraria Campus
2002 establishments in Colorado
W Line (RTD)
Railway stations in Colorado at university and college campuses